Hanna Björg Kjartansdóttir (born 30 September 1974) is an Icelandic former multi-sport athlete, competing in the Icelandic top-tier leagues in basketball and football. She won several Icelandic championships in basketball and was a member of the Icelandic national basketball team. In 2001, she was named to the Icelandic basketball team of the 20th century.

Achievement

Awards
 Icelandic basketball team of the 20th century
 Úrvalsdeild Domestic Player of the Year (1992)
4x Úrvalsdeild Domestic All-First Team (1992, 1999, 2000, 2001)

Titles
5x Icelandic champion (1993, 1994, 1995, 1999, 2001)
6× Icelandic Basketball Cup (1992, 1993, 1994, 1999, 2001, 2006)
2× Icelandic Supercup (1995, 1999)
Icelandic Company Cup (2000)
Danish Basketball Cup (2002)

References

External links

1974 births
Living people
Hanna Björg Kjartansdóttir
Dameligaen players
Hanna Björg Kjartansdóttir
Hanna Björg Kjartansdóttir
Hanna Björg Kjartansdóttir
Hanna Björg Kjartansdóttir
Hanna Björg Kjartansdóttir
Hanna Björg Kjartansdóttir
Hanna Björg Kjartansdóttir
Hanna Björg Kjartansdóttir
Hanna Björg Kjartansdóttir
Hanna Björg Kjartansdóttir
Hanna Björg Kjartansdóttir
Hanna Björg Kjartansdóttir
Hanna Björg Kjartansdóttir
Women's association footballers not categorized by position